Igor Alexandrovich Zevelev (Russian: Игорь Александрович Зевелëв) is a Russian political scientist who has been a Global Fellow at the Wilson Center since 2020.

Youth and education 
Igor Zevelev was born in Tashkent, former USSR. In 1966, when he was ten years old, he moved to Moscow with his parents and sister. In 1978 he graduated from the Institute of Asian and African Countries at Lomonosov Moscow State University, where he majored in history and studied Burmese, Chinese, and English. Zevelev defended his Ph.D. in history at Lomonosov Moscow State University in 1982.

In 1992, he defended his Doctor of Sciences degree (the highest academic rank in Russia) in political science at the Institute of World Economy and International Relations (IMEMO) in Moscow.

Career 
Igor Zevelev has had an academic and research career intertwined with leadership positions in the fields of philanthropy and journalism.

After graduating from Lomonosov Moscow State University's Institute of Asian and African Countries, Igor Zevelev embarked upon an academic career. From 1981 to 1988, he worked as a research fellow at Moscow Institute of Oriental Studies. From 1988 to 1999, he served as Deputy Director and Head of Department at the Center for Developing Countries at the Moscow Institute of World Economy and International Relations (IMEMO).

In 1992, Igor Zevelev was invited as visiting professor to the University of Washington in Seattle, Washington. This was the first of several visiting professorships in the United States. Throughout the 1990s, he taught at San Jose State University, at the University of California, Berkeley, at the Jackson School of International Studies of the University of Washington, and at Macalester College. Zevelev taught courses pertaining to Russian area studies and security studies, international relations, nationalism, human rights, great powers and comparative democracy.

In 2000, Zevelev left the United States for a teaching position at the George C. Marshall European Center for Security Studies in Garmisch-Partenkirchen, Germany, where he worked as Professor of Russian Studies for five years.

In 2005, Zevelev returned to Washington, DC to serve as Washington Bureau Chief for the RIA Novosti Russian News and Information Agency.

In 2008, Igor Zevelev returned to Moscow from the United States and took up the position of Director of the John D. and Catherine T. MacArthur Foundation's Russia office. The MacArthur Foundation has awarded more than $173 million in grants to further higher education in Russia, advance human rights, and limit the proliferation of nuclear weapons. After the Foundation’s Russia office was closed down, Igor Zevelev continued his research in the United States. He was a Fellow at the Woodrow Wilson International Center for Scholars and the Center for Security and International Studies (CSIS) in Washington in 2016-2017. He also taught at the School of Advanced International Studies (SAIS) of Johns Hopkins University in 2017. In 2017–2019, Igor Zevelev worked as Professor of National Security Studies at the George C. Marshall European Center for Security Studies. He has been a Global Fellow at the Wilson Center since 2020.

Igor Zevelev has been awarded several research grants in the United States and Europe for research topics pertaining to Russian foreign policy, international relations and security studies. These awards include the Woodrow Wilson Fellowship (1996–1997 and 2016–2017) and the Jennings Randolph Program for International Peace Senior Fellowship (1997–1998).

Igor Zevelev was a member of the Valdai Discussion Club in 2005–2013. He was also the Donors Forum Council member in 2009-2014 and a member of the Sustainable Partnership with Russia (SuPR) Group at the PIR Center in 2010–2014.

Research focus 
Igor Zevelev has published five books and about sixty academic articles. Coming from an academic background in history and Asian studies, Igor Zevelev began his research with the topics of urbanization and development in Southeast Asia and human rights in Asian countries during the late 1980s and early 1990s. More recently Zevelev has turned to international politics and worked on Russian foreign policy, Russia–United States relations, Russia-US-China relations and international security.

One of his major contributions to the fields of political science and post-Soviet studies was his single-authored book Russia and its New Diasporas (US Institute of Peace Press 2001), written during Zevelev’s stay at the United States Institute of Peace and the Wilson Center. In this book, he examines the political significance of new ethnic Russian “diaspora” communities for the future of Eurasian and international security. Zevelev poses questions about Russia’s national identity, territorial reach, and political influence. Zevelev draws from literature on ethnicity, identity and nationalism analyses the Russian Federation’s official policies towards Russian diaspora over time.

Most of Igor Zevelev’s current work focuses on Russian-American and Russian-Chinese relations, as well as Russian national identity and foreign policy. He places these problems into a broad international comparative context. These efforts are reflected in “Russia’s Contested National Identity and Foreign Policy,” (co-authored with Andrew Kuchins), in Henry Nau and Deepa Ollapally, eds., Worldviews of Aspiring Powers (New York, NY: Oxford University Press, 2012); “Russian Perspectives on US-China Relations and the Twenty-First-Century Global System,” in Aharon Klieman, ed.,  Great Powers and Geopolitics. International Affairs in a Rebalancing World (Springer, 2015); and Russian National Identity and Foreign Policy (Washington, DC: CSIS Report, 2016).

Select publications

Books 
 Russia and Its New Diasporas (Washington, DC: The United States Institute of Peace Press, 2001).
 Co-edited with Sharyl Cross, Global Security Beyond the Millennium: American and Russian Perspectives (London: Macmillan Press, 1999).
 Modern Asia: Political Development and Human Rights (Moscow: IMEMO, 1991), in Russian.
 Urbanization and Development in Asia (Moscow: Progress Publishers, 1989), in English; (Moscow: Progress Publishers, 1990), in Bengali; (Moscow-Delhi-Jaipur: Progress Publishers-People's Publishing House-Rajasthan People's Publishing House, 1990), in Hindi.
 Southeast Asia: Urbanization and Problems of Social Development (Moscow: Nauka Publishers, 1985), in Russian.

Selected articles, book chapters, and papers 
 “The Russian World in Moscow’s Strategy,” CSIS Commentary, August 22, 2016.
 Russian National Identity and Foreign Policy (Washington, DC: CSIS Report, 2016).
 “Russian Perspectives on US-China Relations and the Twenty-First-Century Global System,” in Aharon Klieman, ed., Great Powers and Geopolitics. International Affairs in a Rebalancing World (Springer, 2015).
 “A New Realism for the 21st Century: U.S.-China Relations and Russia’s Choice,” Russia in Global Affairs, no. 6 (2012), in Russian; no. 6 (2012), in English.
 “Russia’s Contested National Identity and Foreign Policy,” (co-authored with Andrew Kuchins), in Henry Nau and Deepa Ollapally, eds., Worldviews of Aspiring Powers (Ney York, NY: Oxford University Press, 2012).
 “Russian Foreign Policy: Continuity in Change” (co-authored with Andrew Kuchins), The Washington Quarterly 35, no. 1 (Winter 2012).
 “Russia and the New “Russian World,” in Maria Lipman and Nikolay Petrov, eds., Russia in 2020 (Washington, DC: Carnegie Endowment for International Peace,2011), in English. Also published in Russian (Moscow: ROSSPEN, 2012).
 “The ‘Russian Question’ after the Fall of the USSR,” Pro et Contra 14, no. 4-5 (July- October 2010), in Russian.
 “Russian-American Relations in Global Context,” in V. Sumskiy and V. Khoros, eds., The North-the South-Russia, 2009 Yearbook (Moscow: IMEMO RAN, 2010), in Russian.
 “The Future of Russia: Nation or Civilization?” Russia in Global Affairs 7, no. 5 (2009), in Russian; 7, no 4 (2009), in English.
 “Compatriots” in the Russian Policy in the Post-Soviet Space: Imperial Legacy and State Pragmatism,” in A. Miller, ed., The Legacy of the Empires and Russia’s Future (Moscow: NLO, 2008), in Russian.
 “Russia’s Policy Toward Compatriots in the Former Soviet Union,” Russia in Global Affairs 6, no. 1 (2008), in Russian; 6, no 1 (2008), in English.
 “Diasporas in Russia’s Security Strategy,” in R. Wirsing and R. Azizian, eds., Ethnic Diasporas and Great Power Strategies in Asia (New Delhi: India Research Press and Asia-Pacific Center for Security Studies, 2007).
 “Russia and China in the Mirror of the US Policies,” (co-authored with Mikhail Troitsky), Russia in Global Affairs 5, no. 5 (2007), in Russian; no. 4, in English.
 “Semiotics of the American-Russian Relations” (co-authored with Mikhail Troitsky), World Economy and International Relations, no. 1 (2007), in Russian.
 Power and Influence in the US-Russian Relations: Semiotic Analysis (co-authored with Mikhail Troitsky), Moscow: NOFMO, 2006, in Russian.
 “Russian and American National Identity, Foreign Policy, and Bilateral Relations,” International Politics 39, no. 4 (2002).

Interviews, presentations, and commentaries 
Online event Russia post Soviet space national identity and citizenship regime (alternative link: YouTube
 US-Russia relations worse the cold war
 www.golos-ameriki.ru
 Russian national identity and foreign policy
 www.bfm.ru
 US-Russia tensions cold war
 www.csis.org
 YouTube
 www.rbc.ru
 YouTube
 American views US-Russian relations
 www.c-spanvideo.org
 voiceofrussia.com
 ria.ru
 onpoint.wbur.org
 www.c-spanvideo.org

References

External links

Russian political scientists
Living people
Writers from Tashkent
Moscow State University alumni
Russian international relations scholars
Year of birth missing (living people)
Academic staff of the Moscow Institute of Oriental Studies